The 1996 USC Trojans football team represented the University of Southern California (USC) in the 1996 NCAA Division I-A football season. In their 11th and final year under head coach John Robinson, the Trojans compiled a 6–6 record (3–5 against conference opponents), finished in a five-way tie for fifth place in the Pacific-10 Conference (Pac-10) championship, and outscored their opponents by a combined total of 325 to 267.

Quarterback Brad Otton led the team in passing, completing 196 of 370 passes for 2,649 yards with 20 touchdowns and 10 interceptions. LaVale Woods led the team in rushing with 119 carries for 601 yards and seven touchdowns. Chris Miller led the team in receiving with 43 catches for 793 yards and five touchdowns.

Schedule

Roster

Season summary

Notre Dame

Team players in the NFL

References

USC
USC Trojans football seasons
USC Trojans football